Viktor Leonidovich Pokrovsky (1889 – 9 November 1922) was a Russian lieutenant general and one of the leaders of anti-communist counterrevolutionary White Army during Russian Civil War.

Biography

Viktor Pokrovsky graduated from Pavlovsk army cadet and Sevastopol aviation military schools. He served in the Russian army during First World War as a pilot and was awarded Cross of St. George for bravery.

Russian Civil War

In December 1917, after the October Revolution, Kuban Ataman Filimonov supported the formation of a volunteer unit under the command of Pokrovsky. On 4 and 6 February, his men won two victories over the Bolsheviks at Enem and Georgie-Afipskaia, killing the Bolshevik leaders Iakovlev and Seradze. Kuban Rada promoted him to the rank of colonel after a hero's welcome in Ekaterinodar.  On 27 February, he was made Commander-in-Chief of the Kuban army.  However, on 13 March, the army of 3000 soldiers, accompanied by 2000 civilians, was forced to abandon Ekaterinodar.  By the end of March, Pokrovsky combined his forces with the Volunteer Army during the Ice March.

Pokrovsky's men played a key role in the capture of Tsaritsyn and Kamyshin from the Bolshevik forces in the summer of 1919. Many in the White movement, including military officers, complained about Pokrovsky's penchant to hang prisoners.

Exile
In April 1920, he emigrated from Crimea because general Wrangel did not appoint him to any key positions at his headquarters.  In emigration, he settled in Bulgaria and continued anti-Soviet activities. On 9 November 1922 he was killed by the Bulgarian police while resisting arrest in a murder investigation.

See also
 White movement
 Volunteer Army
 Russian Civil War

References

1889 births
1922 deaths
Kuban Cossacks
Russian generals
Russian anti-communists
Russian World War I flying aces
Russian people of World War I
People of the Russian Civil War
White movement generals
White Russian emigrants to Bulgaria
Russian people murdered abroad
People murdered in Bulgaria
Emigrants from the Russian Empire to Bulgaria
People shot dead by law enforcement officers